The New York State Chief Administrator of the Courts (or Chief Administrative Judge of the Courts if a judge) oversees the administration and operation of the New York State Unified Court System. They are appointed by the Chief Judge of New York with the advice and consent of the Administrative Board of the Courts. They are assisted by the Office of Court Administration. 

List of Chief Administrative Judges 
Recent Chief Administrative Judges:

Richard J. Bartlett, 1974–1979
Herbert J. Evans, 1979–1983
Robert J. Sise, 1983–1985
Joseph W. Bellacosa, 1985–1987
Albert M. Rosenblatt, 1987–1989
Matthew T. Crosson, 1989–1993
E. Leo Milonas, 1993–1995
Jonathan Lippman, 1996–2007
Ann Pfau, 2007–2011
A. Gail Prudenti, 2011–2015
Lawrence K. Marks, 2015–present

References

External links 
 Rules of the Chief Administrator of the Courts in the New York Codes, Rules and Regulations
 Office of Court Administration on Open NY (https://data.ny.gov/)

New York (state) state courts
Court administration